Breydel is a Flemish surname.

People with the name include:
 Frans Breydel (1679–1750), Flemish painter
 Jan Breydel (–), Flemish rebel leader
 Karel Breydel (1678–1733), Flemish painter

Surnames of Belgian origin